The Canton of Saint-Thégonnec is a French former canton, located in the arrondissement of Morlaix, in the Finistère département (Brittany région). It had 8,001 inhabitants (2012). It was disbanded following the French canton reorganisation which came into effect in March 2015.

Composition
The canton comprised the following 5 communes:
Saint-Thégonnec (seat)
 Le Cloître-Saint-Thégonnec
 Loc-Eguiner-Saint-Thégonnec
 Pleyber-Christ
 Plounéour-Ménez

See also
Cantons of the Finistère department
Arrondissements of the Finistère department

References

Former cantons of Finistère
2015 disestablishments in France
States and territories disestablished in 2015